Michael Hutt may refer to:

 Michael Hutt (orientalist)
 Michael Hutt (pathologist)